Eulophia graminea, the Chinese crown orchid, is a species of orchid native to Asia. It often develops a pseudobulb. It is considered invasive in Florida and spreads with wood chip mulch. Flowers are green and brownish purple.

References

graminea
Orchids of Bhutan
Plants described in 1833